Criminally Insane 2 (also known as Crazy Fat Ethel II) is a 1987 horror film written and directed by Nick Millard. It is the sequel to the 1975 film Criminally Insane.

This sequel was shot on video and is 50% clips from its predecessor (presented as flashbacks). The film contains roughly just 30 minutes of new content. The new content has no soundtrack (the only music in the film is during the reused flashback footage), and the video quality is markedly poor, a constant whirring of the machinery being audible.

Plot 
Due to budget cuts, an asylum for the criminally insane releases the infamous Ethel Janowski, a morbidly obese woman whose obsession with food caused her to murder six people 13 years earlier, into a halfway house operated by the elderly Hope Bartholomew. As soon as Ethel is admitted into the Bartholomew House, it becomes clear that she's still delusional, convinced that Hope is her dead grandmother, and that a fellow patient named Edgar Stanley is the detective who arrested her. As time passes, Ethel begins demanding more food and refusing to take her medication.

One day, while Hope is out, an orderly feeds the residents dog food, and taunts Ethel by slowly eating a chocolate bar in front of her. Ethel snaps, and kills the orderly by hanging him with a cord, an act witnessed by Edgar. A lieutenant is called in to investigate the death, and leaves after questioning Ethel. Edgar tells Ethel that he will keep quiet about what she did, in exchange for her desserts. Ethel tries to poison Edgar, and when that fails, she resorts to stabbing him with four knives.

After another visit from the lieutenant, Hope catches Ethel eating a bag of pretzels, and confiscates them. Ethel then kills Hope, then says "I guess I just lost hope," and laughs. Ethel proceeds to murder the remaining resident (a man who believed he was an insect) and one of the institution doctors when he drops by to see why his calls to the halfway house have not been getting through. Ethel then dances with a dog and a knife in the house's backyard, and when the lieutenant returns she answers the door, and laughs crazily as she states, "Welcome to Bartholomew House. I'm Hope Bartholomew, and I hope you'll be very happy here!"

Cast 
 Priscilla Alden as Ethel Janowsky
 Joe Elliot as Dinner Server
 Albert Eskinazi as Edgar Stanley
 Royal Farros as Doctor
 Frances Millard as Hope Bartholomew
 Nick Millard as Doctor Stevens
 Fred Sarra as Lieutenant Frank Harris

Reception 
Bill Gibron of DVD Talk awarded the film a score of 2/5, and wrote, "While there is some enjoyment to be had in revisiting a favorite fiend, Criminally Insane 2 is nothing more than a novelty. It can't hold a moldering corpse to its predecessor." A zero was given by Slasherpool, which called the film "suckalicious" and "embarrassingly awful". All DVD Verdict's David Johnson wrote in regards to Criminally Insane 2 was, "The less I say about this horrible movie the better."

References

External links 

 

1987 films
American sequel films
Camcorder films
1987 horror films
Films set in 1986
American exploitation films
American serial killer films
American comedy horror films
1980s English-language films
Films shot in California
Films about mental health
American independent films
Films about food and drink
American black comedy films
Films set in San Francisco
1980s American films